The Sydney Football Club was an Australian rules football club founded on 7 August 1880 and based in Sydney.

In 1886 the club went undefeated winning 12 games and drawing 2. In that season, they scored 52 goals, the record for goals scored up to that point.

References

1881 establishments in Australia
1954 disestablishments in Australia
Australian rules football clubs in Sydney